The first season of the drama television series Winners & Losers originally aired between 22 March and 23 August 2011 on the Seven Network in Australia. The season consisted of 22 episodes and aired on Tuesdays at 8:30 pm, replacing Packed to the Rafters.

Production 
The season was first aired on the Seven Network in Australia on 22 March 2011. The executive producer was John Holmes and the producer was Maryanne Carroll. Level Two Music helped to supply music for the series.

Plot 
When you're 27 years old, high school feels like a long time ago. But how much do we really change in ten years? Does a successful career or a hot fiancé make you one of life's winners? Or are we still the same old losers we were in high school?

With a surprise invite to their "Ten Year High School Reunion", Bec, Jenny, Frances and Sophie are about to discover what it really means to be a winner.

Cast

Main 
 Melissa Bergland as Jenny Gross
 Virginia Gay as Frances James
 Zoe Tuckwell-Smith as Bec Gilbert
 Melanie Vallejo as Sophie Wong
 Damien Bodie as Jonathan Kurtiss
 Blair McDonough as Matt O'Connor
 Stephen Phillips as Zach Armstrong (19 episodes)
 Tom Wren as Doug Graham
 Denise Scott as Trish Gross
 Francis Greenslade as Brian Gross (20 episodes)
 Sarah Grace as Bridget Fitzpatrick (16 episodes)
 Jack Pearson as Patrick Gross (20 episodes)

Recurring 
 Mike Smith as Callum Gilbert (17 episodes)
 Paul Moore as Wes Fitzpatrick (12 episodes)
 Mark Leonard-Winter as JB Bartlett (8 episodes)
 Nick Simpson-Deeks as Rhys Mitchell (7 episodes)
 Nell Feeney as Carolyn Gilbert (7 episodes)
 Natalie Walker as Donna Wong (6 episodes)
 Michala Banas as Tiffany Turner (5 episodes)
 Geoff Morrell as Paul Armstrong (5 episodes)
 Carmen Duncan as Prof. Kerry Green (4 episodes)
 Dan Feurerriegel as Jake Peters (4 episodes)
 Glenda Linscott as Lily Patterson (4 episodes)
 PiaGrace Moon as Jasmine Patterson (4 episodes)

Guest 
 Lawrence Mooney as Trevor Myers (3 episodes)
 Greg Stone as Steve Gilbert (3 episodes)
 Nicki Paull as Leanne O'Connor (3 episodes)
 Judith McGrath as Maria Crawley (2 episodes)
 Rob Mills as Sean Brody (2 episodes)
 Jacob Allan as Chugga McKinnon (2 episodes)
 Natalie Saleeba as Claire Armstrong (2 episodes)
 Todd McKenney as Bryce Thomson (1 episode)
 Julia Blake as Gwen Armstrong (1 episode)
 John Flaus as Don Armstrong (1 episode)
 Madeleine West as Deidre Gross (1 episode)
 Kevin Harrington as Nev Barnsworth (1 episode)

Casting 
The season had a cast of twelve actors who received star billing. 
Melissa Bergland, Zoe Tuckwell-Smith, Melanie Vallejo and Virginia Gay portrayed the four protagonists or "losers"; Jenny Gross, Bec Gilbert, Sophie Wong and Frances James respectively. During early production, the four actresses were forced to spend time together to build up chemistry between them. Former Neighbours actors Blair McDonough and Damien Bodie played Matt O'Connor and Jonathan Kurtiss. Tom Wren portrayed Doug Graham, Sophie's best friend. Stephen Phillips starred as Zach Armstrong, Frances' business partner and love interest. Comedian Denise Scott appeared as Trish Gross, while Francis Greenslade portrayed Brian Gross, Jenny's parents. Jack Pearson and Sarah Grace portrayed Jenny's siblings Patrick and Bridget Gross.

A number of secondary characters were also portrayed throughout the season, including Michala Banas as Tiffany Turner, the woman who bullied Jenny, Bec, Sophie and Frances during high school. PiaGrace Moon was cast as Frances' younger sister Jasmine Patterson. Lawrence Mooney appeared as Trevor Myers, Geoff Morrell as Paul Armstrong, Mark Leonard Winter as James 'JB' Bartlett, Madeleine West as Deidre Gross, Scott McGregor as Brett, Todd McKenney as Jenny's Boss and Alex Perry as a Fashion Presenter.

Episodes

{| class="wikitable plainrowheaders" style="margin: auto; width: 100%"
|-
!! style="background-color:#A0C435; color: #000; text-align: center;" width=5%|No. inseries
!! style="background-color:#A0C435; color: #000; text-align: center;" width=5%|No. inseason
!! style="background-color:#A0C435; color: #000; text-align: center;" width=25%|Title
!! style="background-color:#A0C435; color: #000; text-align: center;" width=16%|Directed by
!! style="background-color:#A0C435; color: #000; text-align: center;" width=28%|Written by
!! style="background-color:#A0C435; color: #000; text-align: center;" width=14%|Original air date
!! style="background-color:#A0C435; color: #000; text-align: center;" width=7%|Australian viewers
|-

|}

DVD release

Reception

Critical response 
A writer from The Advertiser said that the series was a success because the "creative force Bevan Lee" was behind it. Jim Schembri writing for The Sydney Morning Herald had praise for the "fresh, brightly coloured, high-end soap", labelling the characters as "some of the most engaging" on television. The Age's reviewer observed the series as having "powerful themes of friendship, karma and justice for the underdog", which were played with subtle tone unlike other shows. They added that the mixture of "lively characters" and comedy made for "an engaging hour of television". Other columnists from The Age criticised certain aspects of the series. Paul Kalina accused Winners & Losers of playing it safe by implementing similar elements which made Packed to the Rafters a successful show.

Bridget McManus came to the conclusion that the series had eventually lost the "edge" it once possessed and even began to resemble a "poor girl's Sex and the City". A fellow columnist from The Age had also drawn comparisons to the American drama. McManus continued by identifying the main problem as being that the "potentially interesting characters" not being used as much as the four female protagonists. She concluded that the quartet were tired stereotypes of "the virgin, the damned whore, God's policewoman and a clown." Writing for the Radio Times, Claire Webb commented that Winners & Losers was "hardly the most original plot", but added "Still, the sassy script rattles rib-ticklingly along, and it's easy to see why this Australian series proved so popular Down Under."

Ratings 
The pilot episode of Winners & Losers averaged 1.7 million viewers. It was the number one show in the 16–39 and 25–54 demographics, helping to win the network the night with a 33.6 per cent share. Seven decided to air the second and third episodes back to back, securing the highest ratings for the night once again with averages of 1.7 and 1.5 million viewers. The series continued to fare well in the ratings over the following weeks, which prompted a reporter from The Advertiser to state "No doubt part of Winners & Losers' early success can be attributed to creative force Bevan Lee, also the drama whiz behind Rafters and one-time ratings hit Always Greener. However, the ratings for the seventh episode "Like a Virgin" revealed Winners & Losers had lost over four hundred thousand viewers since its debut. The episode averaged 1.2 million viewers. The commercial audience of the series also dropped from 37.6 to 33.5, but it remained one of the twelve most watched programs in Australia.

Accolades 
During its first season, Winners & Losers and its cast were nominated for six awards. The series received a nomination for Best Television Program from the AACTA Television Awards, while Tom Wren earned a nomination for Best Male Performance. The actor was later nominated for Most Popular New Male Talent at the Logie Awards, while Winners & Losers gathered a nomination in the Most Popular Drama Series category. Actress Melissa Bergland won the Most Popular New Female Talent award, while also garnering a nomination for Most Outstanding New Talent.

References

External links 
 

2011 Australian television seasons